The leucines are primarily the four isomeric amino acids: leucine, isoleucine, tert-leucine (terleucine, pseudoleucine) and norleucine. Being compared with the four butanols, they could be classified as butyl-substituted glycines; they represent all four possible variations.

Leucine and isoleucine belong to the proteinogenic amino acids; the others are non-natural.

Isomers
Including the stereoisomers, six further isomers could be added: D-leucine, D-isoleucine, L-alloisoleucine, D-alloisoleucine, D-tert-leucine and D-norleucine.

Derivatives
Cycloleucine could be classified as a cyclic derivative of norleucine. With a cyclopentane-ring, it has two hydrogen atoms fewer and thus is not an isomer. The α-carbon atom is not a stereocenter.

See also 
 L-Photo-Leucine

Amino acids

Literature 
 Jeremy M. Berg, John L. Tymoczko, Lubert Stryer: Biochemie. 6 Auflage, Spektrum Akademischer Verlag, Heidelberg 2007. .
 Donald Voet, Judith G. Voet: Biochemistry. 3. Auflage, John Wiley & Sons, New York 2004. .
 Bruce Alberts, Alexander Johnson, Peter Walter, Julian Lewis, Martin Raff, Keith Roberts: Molecular Biology of the Cell, 5. Auflage, Taylor & Francis 2007, .